Maryline Salvetat (born 12 February 1974) is a French cyclist born in Castres. She participates in road cycling as well as in cyclo-cross and mountain biking. In 2002, 2004, and 2005 she became French national champion in cyclo-cross. In 2004, she also won the silver medal at the cyclo-cross European and World Championships.

Honours

Road cycling

1991
 U19 Road Race Champion
1992
 U19 Road Race Champion
1994
2nd, Grand Prix de France
3rd, Chrono des Herbiers
1995
2nd, Grand Prix de France
1996
1st, Grand Prix de France
2nd, Chrono des Herbiers
1997
2nd, Chrono des Herbiers
1998
3rd, Grand Prix de France
2003
2nd, French National Championship
2006
1st, Trophée des Grimpeurs
2nd, Overall, Grande Boucle Féminine Internationale
3rd, French Time Trial Championship
2007
 French Time Trial Champion
3rd, Overall, Route de France Féminine

Cyclo-cross

2001
2nd, French National Championship
2nd, Liévin
2002
 Cyclo-Cross Champion
2nd, Lapalisse
2nd, Sedan
2003
1st, Liévin
1st, Athée-sur-Cher
1st, Sedan
2nd, French National Championship
2nd, Koksijde
2nd, Wetzikon
3rd, Sankt-Wendel
2004
 Cyclo-Cross Champion
 World Cyclo-Cross Championship
 European Cyclo-Cross Championship
1st, Bollène
1st, Sedan
1st, Lons-le-Saunier
2nd, Nommay
2nd, Milan
2nd, Hofstade
2005
 Cyclo-Cross Champion
1st, Athée-sur-Cher
2nd, Fourmies
3rd, Nommay
3rd, Pijnacker
3rd, Hofstade
2006
1st, Nommay
2nd, French National Championship
2nd, Blaye
2007
 Cyclo-Cross World Champion
 Cyclo-Cross Champion
 European Cyclo-Cross Championship
1st, Grand Prix du Nouvel-An
1st, Sarrebourg
1st, Hofstade
2nd, Nommay
2nd, Gavere-Asper
2nd, Quelneuc
3rd, Koksijde
2008
1st, Grand Prix du Nouvel-An
2nd, French National Championship
2nd, Liévin
2nd, Hoogerheide

Mountain biking

2005
2nd, French National Championship

External links

1974 births
Living people
People from Castres
French female cyclists
Cyclo-cross cyclists
French mountain bikers
Olympic cyclists of France
Cyclists at the 2008 Summer Olympics
UCI Cyclo-cross World Champions (women)
Officers of the Ordre national du Mérite
Sportspeople from Tarn (department)
Cyclists from Occitania (administrative region)